Ross Lake is a reservoir in the U.S. state of Wisconsin.

Ross Lake was named after the local Ross family, who once owned the site.

References

Lakes of Wood County, Wisconsin
Lakes of Wisconsin